The 2001–02 Northern Premier League season was the 34th in the history of the Northern Premier League, a football competition in England. Teams were divided into two divisions; the Premier and the First.

Premier Division 

The Premier Division featured three new teams:

 Bradford Park Avenue promoted as champions of Division One
 Vauxhall Motors promoted as runners-up of Division One
 Burton Albion transferred from the Southern League Premier Division

League table

Results

Division One 

Division One featured 4 new teams:

 Leek Town relegated from Premier Division
 Spennymoor United relegated from Premier Division
 Ossett Albion promoted as runners-up from the Northern Counties East League Premier Division
 Rossendale United promoted as champions of the North West Counties League Division One

League table

Results

Play-offs

Promotion and relegation 

In the thirty-fourth season of the Northern Premier League Burton Albion (as champions) were automatically promoted to the Football Conference. Bishop Auckland and Bamber Bridge were relegated to the First Division; these two clubs were replaced by relegated Conference side Stalybridge Celtic, First Division winners Harrogate Town and play-off winners Ashton United. In the First Division Gretna left the League to join the Scottish Football League Third Division, while Ossett Albion left the League altogether; these teams were replaced by newly admitted Alfreton Town and Kidsgrove Athletic.

Cup Results
Challenge Cup: Teams from both leagues.

Accrington Stanley bt. Bradford Park Avenue 

President's Cup: 'Plate' competition for losing teams in the NPL Cup.

Barrow bt. Gainsborough Trinity

Chairman's Cup: 'Plate' competition for losing teams in the NPL Cup.

Worksop Town bt. Droylsden

Peter Swales Shield: Between Champions of NPL Premier Division and Winners of the NPL Cup.

Accrington Stanley bt. Burton Albion

External links 
 Northern Premier League Tables at RSSSF

Northern Premier League seasons
6